The National Music Award is one of Spain's annual National Awards by the Ministry of Culture.

The Spanish Government makes an annual recognition of the people or groups who have made an outstanding or innovative contribution to Spanish cultural life over the previous 12 months, through the conferring of an award in one of 29 areas covering the spectrum of plastic, fine and performing arts, literature, film, history and so on.

The Spanish Ministry of Culture awards two prizes for music every year, generally one for creation (composition) and one for interpretation (work by an individual artist or ensemble, or a musicologist).
The Award is granted before 15 December each year on the basis of works published or performed during the preceding 12 months. 
In addition to the recognition carried by the awards, there is also prize money of 30,000 euros for each of the two categories.

A separate award for contemporary music, the Premio Nacional de las Músicas Actuales, was instituted in 2009.

References

External links
 

Awards established in 1980
Spanish music awards